The Saami Council Literature Prize (and ) is a literary prize for Saami literature first awarded by the Saami Council in 1994. At first, the prize was awarded annually, although starting in 2003, it has been awarded roughly once every two years with authors of children's and young adult literature being honored every other time.

In 2007, the total monetary value of the prize was 3,000 euro.

Background 
The Saami Council decided to launch its own literary award in order to encourage people to write in the Saami languages. For this reason, all works nominated for the award must have been originally written in one of the Saami languages or translated from another language into one of the smaller Saami languages. Only works published within the two years preceding the award are eligible for nomination.

Laureates

References 

Saami Council Literature Prize
Awards established in 1994